Big Brown Eyes is a 1936 American crime comedy film. In the film, police officer Danny Barr (Cary Grant) is chasing jewel robbers. His girlfriend Eve Fallon (Joan Bennett) is initially working as a manicurist, but quickly takes a job as a reporter assisting in the effort against the jewel thieves. Fallon and Barr become disgusted when one jewel gang member is acquitted after killing a baby in Central Park, and both leave their jobs. Soon thereafter, Fallon gets a lucky break while giving a manicure and the case is solved.

Main cast
Cary Grant as  Det. Sgt. Danny Barr 
Joan Bennett as  Eve Fallon 
Walter Pidgeon as  Richard Morey 
Lloyd Nolan as  Russ Cortig 
Alan Baxter as  Cary Butler 
Marjorie Gateson as  Mrs. Chesley Cole 
Isabel Jewell as  Bessie Blair 
Douglas Fowley as  Benjamin 'Benny' Battle

Reception
The film recorded a loss of $14,645. Critics have regarded it as "disposable" and "inconsequential" with "shoddy writing and generally uninspired performances."

Writing for The Spectator in 1936, Graham Greene gave the film a positive review, characterizing it as "a fast well-directed and quite unsentimental gangster film, pleasantly free from emotion".

More recent writers have been kinder to the film. Grant biographer Scott Eyman called it an "unheralded gem in Grant's catalogue, a snappy comedy-drama [...] a cheerfully disreputable pre-Code film unaccountably made after the Code, with speedy cross-talk that prefigures His Girl Friday." Writing for The New Yorker, Richard Brody hailed the "cocksure grifters and workaday wiseacres who dish out sharp-edged patter—none more than Grant and Bennett, whose gibing often resembles quasi-Beckettian doubletalk. Here, Grant offers early flashes of the brash, suave, and intricate antics on which his enduring comedic persona is based."

References

External links
 
 

American detective films
1936 films
American black-and-white films
Films directed by Raoul Walsh
Paramount Pictures films
1930s crime comedy films
Films produced by Walter Wanger
American crime comedy films
1936 comedy films
1930s English-language films
1930s American films